Corkbush Field is the land to the east of Hertford along the Ware road, lying between the King's Meads at the bottom of the valley of the River Lea and the higher ground to the south known as Barrow Green Common. It is alternatively known as Cockbush Field in some sources as the 'r' and 'c' are similar in some 17th Century handwriting.  It was the site of the Ware Mutiny, also known as the Corkbush Field Mutiny of 15 November 1647.

Notes

See also
 Corkbush Field Mutiny
 Ware, Hertfordshire
 English Civil War
 Banbury mutiny

Conflicts in 1647
New Model Army
Levellers
Mutinies
1647 in England
Ware, Hertfordshire